Waldfischbach-Burgalben is a Verbandsgemeinde ("collective municipality") in the Südwestpfalz district, in Rhineland-Palatinate, Germany. The seat of the municipality is in Waldfischbach-Burgalben.

The Verbandsgemeinde Waldfischbach-Burgalben consists of the following Ortsgemeinden ("local municipalities"):

 Geiselberg 
 Heltersberg 
 Hermersberg 
 Höheinöd 
 Horbach 
 Schmalenberg 
 Steinalben 
 Waldfischbach-Burgalben

Verbandsgemeinde in Rhineland-Palatinate